Violin Sonata No. 32 in B-flat major (K. 454) was composed by Wolfgang Amadeus Mozart in Vienna on April 21, 1784. It was published by Christoph Torricella in a group of three sonatas (together with the piano sonatas K. 284 and K. 333).

The sonata was written for a violin virtuoso Regina Strinasacchi of Mantua to be performed by them together at a concert in the Kärntnerthor Theater in Vienna on April 29, 1784. Although Mozart had the piano part securely in his head, he did not give himself enough time to write it out, and thus it was performed with a sheet of blank music paper in front of him in order to fool the audience. According to a story told by his widow Constanze Mozart, the Emperor Joseph II saw the empty sheet music through his opera glasses and sent for the composer with his manuscript, at which time Mozart had to confess the truth, although that is likely to have amazed the monarch rather than cause his irritation.

The work consists of three movements:

The sonata opens with an exceptionally slow introduction, in which emphasis is put on the equality of the two instruments, kept throughout the entire work.  The opening theme was later echoed by Haydn Op. 50 No. 1 String Quartet and Beethoven's String Quartet No. 1.  The second movement has a melodic feeling of adagio, which was the tempo written down by Mozart at first, but then crossed out and marked Andante. In the development section there are bold chromatic modulations. The final movement returns to the playful mood of the first, but even so happens to be a very sophisticated Rondo.

The autograph is located in the archive of Stiftelsen Musikkulturens Främjande (The Nydahl Collection) in Stockholm.

Recordings

 1955 - David Oistrakh (violin), Vladimir Yampolsky (piano) - [[EMI - Warner classics)
 1956 – Arthur Grumiaux (violin), Clara Haskil (piano) – Philips
 1981 – Arthur Grumiaux (violin), Walter Klien (piano) – Philips

References

 Ulrich Konrad: Komponieren und Schreiben. Beobachtungen an der autographen Niederschrift von Wolfgang Amadé Mozarts Violinsonate KV 454. In: Die Tonkunst 9 (2015), Heft 2, S. 131–141.

External links

Performance of Violin Sonata No. 32 by Ani Kavafian (violin) and Andre-Michel Schub (piano) from the Isabella Stewart Gardner Museum in MP3 format

454
1784 compositions
Compositions in B-flat major